Deibinson Joel Romero (born September 24, 1986) is a professional baseball third baseman for the Long Island Ducks of the Atlantic League of Professional Baseball. He previously played for the Doosan Bears of the KBO League.

Career

Minnesota Twins
Romero signed with the Minnesota Twins in July 2004. Romero suffered a broken leg in July 2008. The Twins added Romero to their 40-man roster on November 19, 2008. On November 20, 2009, the Twins removed Romero from their 40-man roster. He spent the 2010 season with the advanced Single-A Fort Myers Miracle. He then spent the 2011 and 2012 seasons with the Double-A New Britain Rock Cats. He was invited to Spring Training in 2013 and 2014 but did not make the club either year and spent both seasons in the minors.

Pittsburgh Pirates
Romero signed with the Pittsburgh Pirates on a minor league contract on December 1, 2014. Fangraphs described him as a top minor league free agent. With the Pirates' Triple-A Indianapolis Indians, Romero played in 37 games, batting .301 (37 hits in 123 at-bats), with 6 home runs, 27 RBI, a .396 OBP, and a .545 slugging percentage. He was released by the Pirates in May 2015 to pursue an opportunity in Korea.

Doosan Bears
On May 26, 2015, Romero agreed to a contract with the Doosan Bears. He replaced Zach Lutz on the Bears roster as the foreign hitter. He made his KBO debut on June 5, 2015. Romero slashed .253/.328/.449 with 12 home runs and 50 RBI in 76 games. He won the Korean Series with the Bears in 2015.

New York Yankees
On February 1, 2016, Romero signed a minor league deal with the New York Yankees. On May 29, 2016, Romero was released by the Yankees.

Delfines del Carmen
On June 7, 2016, Romero signed with the Delfines del Carmen of the Mexican Baseball League.

Rojos del Águila de Veracruz
On June 28, 2016, Romero was traded to the Rojos del Águila de Veracruz of the Mexican Baseball League. He was released on July 1, 2016. Romero was reassigned to the team on March 31, 2017, and later released on July 10, 2017.

New Britain Bees
On March 6, 2018, Romero signed with the New Britain Bees of the Atlantic League of Professional Baseball. He re-signed with team in early 2019. 

Before the 2019 season, he was selected for Dominican Republic national baseball team at the 2019 Pan American Games Qualifier.

Long Island Ducks
On June 25, 2019, Romero was traded to the Long Island Ducks of the Atlantic League of Professional Baseball. Romero was named MVP of the 2019 ALPB Championship Series, leading all players in RBIs (9) and tying for the lead in total bases (15) and home runs (2). He re-signed with the Ducks for the 2020 season but did not play in a game due to the cancellation of the ALPB season because of the COVID-19 pandemic.

On June 29, 2021, Romero re-signed with the Ducks. Romero hit .252/.388/.430 with 10 home runs and 47 RBI in 79 games for the Ducks in 2021. He became a free agent following the season. On March 11, 2022, Romero re-signed with the Ducks for the 2022 season.

References

External links

1986 births
Living people
Baseball players at the 2019 Pan American Games
Beloit Snappers players
Dominican Republic expatriate baseball players in Mexico
Dominican Republic expatriate baseball players in South Korea
Dominican Republic expatriate baseball players in the United States
Dominican Republic national baseball team players
Doosan Bears players
Elizabethton Twins players
Fort Myers Miracle players
Gulf Coast Twins players
Indianapolis Indians players
KBO League first basemen
KBO League third basemen
Leones del Escogido players
Long Island Ducks players
Mexican League baseball first basemen
Mexican League baseball third basemen
New Britain Bees players
New Britain Rock Cats players
Rochester Red Wings players
Rojos del Águila de Veracruz players
Toros del Este players
Pan American Games competitors for the Dominican Republic